This page documents the tornadoes and tornado outbreaks of 1974, primarily in the United States. Most tornadoes form in the U.S., although some events may take place internationally. Tornado statistics for older years like this often appear significantly lower than modern years due to fewer reports or confirmed tornadoes.

Synopsis

1974 was exceptionally above average with a record number of seven F5 tornadoes in one year. 366 deaths occurred and almost 7,000 injuries occurred. The worst tornado outbreak of the record-breaking year was the Super Outbreak, which spawned all seven F5 tornadoes.

Events

January
24 tornadoes were reported in the U.S. in the month of January.

February
23 tornadoes were reported in the U.S. in the month of February.

March
36 tornadoes were reported in the U.S. in the month of March.

April
267 tornadoes were reported in the U.S. in the month of April.

April 1–2

A minor two–day tornado outbreak caused 23 tornadoes to form. One of which struck Lawrenceville, Illinois. Another tornado struck Lafayette, Indiana and was given an F2 rating. An F3 tornado struck Huntsville, Alabama killing 1 person. Several F2 tornadoes touched down across Mississippi and Alabama during the outbreak as well.

April 3–4

The 1974 Super Outbreak was one of the most destructive tornado outbreaks ever known in United States history. Many notable tornadoes occurred, such as the Xenia, Ohio tornado which was an F5 tornado that killed 34 people and destroyed a large portion of the town. The Xenia tornado was so strong and the damage so severe, that Dr. Fujita considered rating it an F6, although the scale only went to F5.  He decided not to since some of the damage that would indicate that it could be the mythical F6, might have been due to the structure not being as strong as it should in the first place. One of the 30 violent tornadoes, an F4 striking Monticello, Indiana, produced the longest damage path recorded during the 1974 Super Outbreak, on a southwest to northeast path that nearly crossed the entire state of Indiana. According to most records, this tornado formed near Otterbein in Benton County in west central Indiana to Noble County just northwest of Fort Wayne - a total distance of about 121 miles (195 km). Much of the town was destroyed including the courthouse, some churches and cemeteries, 40 businesses and numerous homes as well as three schools. It also heavily damaged the Penn Central bridge over the Tippecanoe River. Overall damage according to the NOAA was estimated at US$250 million with US$100 million damage in Monticello alone. The Monticello tornado caused 18 deaths. One of the seven F5 tornadoes, the Huntsville, Alabama tornado, took a similar path of the tornado that struck Huntsville on April 1.

A large, F4 tornado struck Louisville, killing 3 people and demolished most of Audubon Elementary School and affected the neighborhoods of Audubon, Cherokee Triangle, Cherokee-Seneca, Crescent Hill, Indian Hills, Northfield, Rolling Fields, and Tyler Park. The fast-moving nighttime tornado that devastated the town of Guin, was the longest-duration F5 tornado recorded in the outbreak and considered to be one of the most violent ever recorded. It formed at around 8:50 pm CDT near the Mississippi-Alabama border, striking the Monterey Trailer Park, resulting in major damage at that location. The tornado  then became extremely violent as it approached and entered Guin, with multiple areas of F5 damage noted in and around town. The tornado first struck the Guin Mobile Home Plant as it entered the town, completely obliterating the structure. Nothing was left of the plant but a pile of mangled steel beams. The town's downtown area was also heavily damaged, with many businesses and two churches completely destroyed. Residential areas in Guin suffered total devastation, with many homes swept completely away and scattered across fields. There were at least 148 tornadoes in the tornado outbreak and 318 fatalities, a record that was beat by the 2011 Super Outbreak.

April 18–21

A widespread tornado outbreak produced at least 36 tornadoes across the Great Plains and Midwest. A multiple-vortex F3 tornado touched down in Wisconsin, striking Lomira, killing 2 people. 159 miles per hour was calculated as a tornado destroyed 30 farms and then went on to rip apart 300 homes in Oshkosh, Wisconsin.

May
144 tornadoes were reported in the U.S. in the month of May.

June
194 tornadoes were reported in the U.S. in June.

June 8

A tornado outbreak produced 36 tornadoes, at least 19 of them significant or intense, and is the second-deadliest June tornado event in Oklahoma history, with 16 deaths reported in the state, second only to the 35 people killed by an F4 tornado on June 12, 1942, in Oklahoma City. The deadliest tornado of the outbreak was a powerful F4 that struck the town of Drumright in Oklahoma, killing 14 people, 12 of whom were killed at Drumright. Another deadly and destructive F4 tornado struck the town of Emporia in Kansas, killing six more people. The outbreak also produced two F3 tornadoes in the Tulsa metropolitan area that killed two people and, combined with flooding, produced the costliest natural disaster in that city's history up to that time—a disaster worth $30,000,000 (1974 USD). Additionally, the outbreak produced non-tornadic winds in the city which reached  for several minutes. In addition to confirmed tornadoes, a possible tornado occurred at 8:15 p.m.

June 18–20

43 tornadoes touched down in the Great Plains and Great Lakes regions, killing 3 people and injuring 78. The strongest tornado of the outbreak was an F4 tornado that struck Des Moines, killing 2 people and injuring 50. June 20 featured 22 tornadoes in Illinois, being one of the highest numbers for Illinois in a single day.

July
59 tornadoes were reported in the U.S. in July.

August
107 tornadoes were reported in the U.S. in August.

September
25 tornadoes were reported in the U.S. in September.

October
45 tornadoes were reported in the U.S. in October.

October 10
Four tornadoes struck Canoncito, New Mexico, with one of them killing an infant in a trailer while also injuring eight other people. This was the first tornado to cause fatalities in New Mexico since 1964.

October 28
An F3 tornado touched down in Baytown, Texas and hit the Baytown Tunnel at rush hour. A dozen cars were picked up and thrown against each other and against the walls of the tunnel entrance. A tunnel guard described the event as "like a big vacuum cleaner". One man died when his car was picked up and thrown over a 20-foot wall. Seven homes were damaged, a maintenance was destroyed and a gas station canopy was blown off. Officially rated F3, Grazulis rated the tornado F2.

November
13 tornadoes were reported in the U.S. in November.

December
8 tornadoes were reported in the U.S. in December.

See also
 Tornado
 Tornadoes by year
 Tornado records
 Tornado climatology
 Tornado myths
 List of tornado outbreaks
 List of F5 and EF5 tornadoes
 List of North American tornadoes and tornado outbreaks
 List of 21st-century Canadian tornadoes and tornado outbreaks
 List of European tornadoes and tornado outbreaks
 List of tornadoes and tornado outbreaks in Asia
 List of Southern Hemisphere tornadoes and tornado outbreaks
 List of tornadoes striking downtown areas
 Tornado intensity
 Fujita scale
 Enhanced Fujita scale

References

 
1974 meteorology
Tornado-related lists by year
Torn